Disaster on the Coastliner is a 1979 American made-for-television action drama film. It was directed by Richard C. Sarafian and starred Lloyd Bridges, Raymond Burr, Robert Fuller, Pat Hingle, E. G. Marshall, Yvette Mimieux, William Shatner, and Paul L. Smith. It originally aired on The ABC Sunday Night Movie on October 28, 1979.

Plot
A disgruntled railroad employee attempts to cause a collision between two passenger trains.

Cast 
Lloyd Bridges - Al Mitchell 
Raymond Burr - Estes Hill 
Robert Fuller - Matt Leigh 
Pat Hingle - John Marsh 
E. G. Marshall - Roy Snyder 
Yvette Mimieux - Paula Harvey 
William Shatner - Stuart Peters 
Paul L. Smith - Jim Waterman / Victor Prescott
Lane Smith - John Carlson
Sandy McPeak - Hennessey
Michael Pataki - Tate
Peter Jason - LeBoux
John Brady - Locomotive Engineer

Production 
The film was shot on a railway line in Connecticut. At his own suggestion William Shatner did his own stunts, including standing on top of a moving F40PH. Years later Shatner called the stunt "the most truly dangerous stunt I ever did" and couldn't imagine "what [he] was thinking" in suggesting it. Shatner compared it to the work he'd done in Kingdom of the Spiders, and wondered which was worse: "standing on top of a speeding locomotive without any kind of safety cable or gluing tarantulas to your face?" Jack Sessums worked on the miniature effects and had his work profiled in TV Guide.

Release 
Disaster on the Coastliner premiered on The ABC Sunday Night Movie on October 28, 1979. Although no DVD or VHS has been released in America, the movie's current owner, Metro-Goldwyn-Mayer, has made the movie available for streaming on Amazon Prime Video and Paramount plus in the United States.

See also
List of television films produced for American Broadcasting Company

References

External links 
 

1979 films
1979 television films
1970s action drama films
1970s American films
1970s disaster films
1970s English-language films
ABC network original films
American action drama films
American drama television films
Disaster television films
Fictional trains
Films directed by Richard C. Sarafian
Films set on trains
Films shot in Connecticut
Rail transport films